Cecil Oakes (1 March 1915 – 10 October 1994) was an Australian cricketer. He played two first-class matches for Tasmania between 1937 and 1938.

See also
 List of Tasmanian representative cricketers

References

External links
 

1915 births
1994 deaths
Australian cricketers
Tasmania cricketers
Cricketers from Hobart